German submarine U-142 was a Type IID U-boat of Nazi Germany's Kriegsmarine during World War II. Her keel was laid down on 12 December 1939 by Deutsche Werke in Kiel as yard number 271. She was launched on 27 July 1940 and commissioned on 4 September 1940 with Oberleutnant zur See Asmus Nicolai Clausen in command.

U-142 began her service life with the 1st U-boat Flotilla. She was then assigned to the 24th Flotilla and subsequently to the 22nd Flotilla where she conducted three patrols, but did not sink or damage any ships. She spent the rest of the war as a training vessel.

She was scuttled on 5 May 1945.

Design
German Type IID submarines were enlarged versions of the original Type IIs. U-142 had a displacement of  when at the surface and  while submerged. She had two shafts and two  propellers.

U-142 was fitted with three  torpedo tubes at the bow, five torpedoes or up to twelve Type A torpedo mines, and a  anti-aircraft gun. The boat had a complement of 25.

Operational career

First patrol
The boat's first patrol commenced with her departure from Gotenhafen, (now Gdynia in modern-day Poland) on 21 June 1941. She arrived in Oxhöft, (a suburb of Gdynia), without incident on 12 July.

Second patrol
Her second foray was also abortive, departing Oxhöft 25 July 1941 and arriving in Stormelö (in southwest Finland) on 9 August.

Third patrol
Her third sortie was equally barren, beginning in Stormelo on 28 August 1941 and ending in Gotenhafen on the 31st.

Loss
U-142 was scuttled in the Raederschleuse (lock) in Wilhelmshaven on 5 May 1945. The wreck was broken up on an unknown date.

References

Bibliography

External links

German Type II submarines
U-boats commissioned in 1940
World War II submarines of Germany
1940 ships
Ships built in Kiel
Operation Regenbogen (U-boat)
Maritime incidents in May 1945